Marguerite Marsh (April 18, 1888 – December 8, 1925) was an American actress of the silent era. She appeared in more than 70 films between 1911 and 1923. Early in her career, she was known as Margaret Loveridge.

Biography
Marsh was the eldest child of S. Charles Marsh and May T. Warne born in Lawrence, Kansas, and she died in New York City from complications of bronchial pneumonia. She was the sister of actress Mae Marsh, editor Frances Marsh, and cinematographer Oliver T. Marsh. 

According to the 1910 Census for Los Angeles, California, Margeurite Marsh was living with her mother May and stepfather William Hall, and she was listed as being married to Donald Loveridge with a daughter Leslie Loveridge. Her daughter appeared in one film titled The Battle of Elderbush Gulch (1913) with Marguerite's sister Mae.

In 1915, she joined the Reliance-Majestic Studios; The Housemaid was her first film for that company. Earlier she had worked for the Biograph Company and Keystone Studios.

Partial filmography

 Under Burning Skies (1912, Short) - At Farewell Party
 A Voice from the Deep (1912, Short) - The Gir
 Just Like a Woman (1912, Short) - In Club
 The New York Hat (1912, Short) - Windowshopper (uncredited)
 Threads of Destiny (1914) - The Nun
 Without Hope (1914) - Hope Frenchman
 Runaway June (1915) - Tommy Thomas / Marie the Apache
 The Price of Power (1916) - Daisy Brooks
 Little Meena's Romance (1916) - Meena's Cousin
 Susan Rocks the Boat (1916) - (uncredited)
 Mr. Goode, Samaritan (1916) - Evelina Good
 Casey at the Bat (1916) - The Judge's Daughter
 The Devil's Needle (1916) - Patricia Devon
 Intolerance (1916) - Debutante
 The Americano (1916)
 Fields of Honor (1918) - Helene
 Our Little Wife (1918) - Angie Martin
 Conquered Hearts (1918) - Nora Carrigan
 The Master Mystery (1918) - Eva Brent
 The Carter Case (1919) - Anita Carver
 A Royal Democrat (1919)
 The Eternal Magdalene (1919) - Elizabeth Bradshaw
 The Phantom Honeymoon (1919) - Betty Truesdale
 Wits vs. Wits (1920) - Helen Marsley
 Women Men Love (1920) - Evelyn Hunter
 The Idol of the North (1921) - Gloria Waldron
 Oh Mary Be Careful (1921) - Susie
 Boomerang Bill (1922) - Annie
 Iron to Gold (1922) - Anne Kirby
 Face to Face (1922) - Helen Marsley
 The Lion's Mouse (1923) - Olga Beverley

References

Sources
1900 United States Federal Census, El Paso Ward 2, El Paso, Texas; Roll  T623_1631; Page: 6A; Enumeration District: 21.
1910 United States Federal Census, Los Angeles Assembly District 75, Los Angeles, California; Roll  T624_84; Page: 4A; Enumeration District: 100; Image: 1107.
Bismarck, North Dakota "Marguerite Marsh Dies", The Bismarck Tribune, December 9, 1925, p. 1.

External links

Marguerite Marsh @ AllMovie.com

1888 births
1925 deaths
American film actresses
American silent film actresses
People from Lawrence, Kansas
People from New York City
Deaths from pneumonia in New York (state)
Actresses from Kansas
20th-century American actresses